Seyyed Hoseyn may refer to:
 Seyyed Hoseyn, Kazerun, Fars Province
 Seyyed Hoseyn, Rostam, Fars Province
 Seyyed Hoseyn, Khuzestan
 Seyyed Hoseyn, Ahvaz, Khuzestan Province
 Seyyed Hoseyn, Kurdistan